Naf Padak (Bengali: নাফ পদক), is a military medal of Bangladesh. In 2000, Bangladesh Rifles (BDR) between Burmese Security Forces (Nasaka) and the Myanmar Army had a major clash known as the Naf War. Myanmar started building dams on the tributaries of the Naf River, which defines the border between Bangladesh and Myanmar. As a result, the course of the river changed and the land of Bangladesh came under the control of Myanmar. After several letters between BDR and Nasaka, they did not stop their work. According to former Bangladesh Rifles (BDR) Director General Major General (retd) Fazlur Rahman, 600 Myanmar soldiers were killed in the three-day conflict, although it has not been confirmed. There were no casualties among BDR members. To honor the bravery of BDR members, the participating BDR members were awarded Naf Padak.

References 

Military awards and decorations of Bangladesh